An Islamic marriage contract is considered an integral part of an Islamic marriage, and outlines the rights and responsibilities of the groom and bride or other parties involved in marriage proceedings under Sharia. Whether it is considered a formal, binding contract depends on the jurisdiction. Islamic faith marriage contracts are not valid in English law.

Witnessing 
In Sunni Islam, a marriage contract must have at least two witnesses. Proper witnessing is critical to the validation of the marriage, also acting as a protection against suspicions of adulterous relationships.

In Shia Islam, witnesses to a marriage are not necessary.  It is also believed that temporary marriage, or Nikah Mut'ah (a type of contract which had more relaxed requirements) was prohibited in Sunni Islam, the necessity of witnessing was introduced by Sunni caliphs, specifically Umar, to ensure that no couples engaged in secret union.

Authorization 
Marriages are usually not held in mosques, (depending on the country and culture of both where the marriage happens and the parties involved) because typically men and women are separated during the ceremony and reception. In Sunni Islam, there is no official clergy, so any Muslim who understands the Islamic tradition can be the official for the wedding. However, if a Muslim wedding is held in a mosque, then a marriage officiant, known as qadi, qazi or madhun, may preside over the wedding.

Contract 

The rights of women proceeding the Advent of Islam as changed drastically to where they stand in society in the twenty first century. Prior to the Advent of Islam, men were allowed to marry or divorce whenever they pleased leading to a number of problems within the society. The current status of marriage in Islam, however, is seen at equal and fair to both men and women and signals the start of family.

The Quran states that you should love your husband or wife, however, divorce is not forbidden. The lifestyles men and women go through following a divorce are very different, women must participate in a period of abstinence and remain single for a period of time. This period of abstinence and being single allows for the father, if the wife was pregnant before the divorce, to know if the unborn child belongs to them or not.

Type and content 

Among the stipulations that can be included in the marriage contract include giving up, or demanding, certain responsibilities. The contract may also be used to regulate the couple's physical relationship, if needed.

The marriage contract can also specify where the couple will live, whether or not the first wife will allow the husband to take a second wife without her consent. The wife has the right to initiate divorce, it is called khula. She either gives back the dowry (mahr) or does not, depending on the reason for divorce. The man has the right to divorce. The marriage contract somewhat resembles the marriage settlements once negotiated for upper-class Western brides, but can extend to non-financial matters usually ignored by marriage settlements or pre-nuptial agreements.

Purposes 

One important purpose of the contract is to make sexual intercourse legal. This is supported by various Hadiths and quotations:

Sahih Bukhari, Book 62, #81:
 Narrated 'Uqba: The Prophet (peace and blessings of Allah be upon him) said: "The stipulations [in the marriage contract] most entitled to be abided by are those with which you are given the right to enjoy the (women's) private parts."

Al-Mughni (by Ibn Qudaamah), Kitab al Nikah:
 ... the Prophet (peace and blessings of Allah be upon him) [said]: "The most deserving of conditions to be fulfilled are those by means of which sexual intercourse becomes permissible for you."

Cited in (Al Aqad, 2014) the common problem of translation of marriage contracts is due to the varieties of word synonyms in the legal Arabic system which have no equivalence in the English system in terms of marriage contracts, such as: مهر, شبكه, صداق - Mahr, Shabkah, Sadaq- (dowry), whereas, all of these examples attributed and affected by the culture and tradition of the Arabic language.

Interfaith marriage 
Interfaith marriage has been a growing concept in the past few years but according to the Quran, Muslims should only marry other Muslims and without doing so can lead to problems within and outside of the families.

One main problem with interfaith marriage as seen in the Islamic community is the fear that one might abandon their faith or their children will not grow up in it. Another issue that can arise is the conflict directly between the two married individuals if their religious traditions get in the way of the other, leading to a debate of which religion should be the more prominent one in the relationship.

See also 
Islamic marital jurisprudence
Islamic marital practices
Islamic sexual jurisprudence
Islamic views on slavery and concubinage
Islamic views on prostitution
Mahr, a mandatory payment, paid or promised to be paid by the groom or his father to the bride at the time of marriage
Marriage in Islam
Minangkabau marriage, marriage practices of West Sumatra, Indonesia
Nikah Halala, the marriage of a woman to a second man after a triple talaq (divorce)
Nikah Ijtimah, a pre-Islamic form of marriage
Nikah Misyar, a marriage practice in Sunni Islam
Nikah mut‘ah, a form of temporary marriage in Shia Islam, also known as sigeh or sigheh in Iran
Nikah 'urfi, a "customary" Sunni Muslim marriage contract
Rights and obligations of spouses in Islam
Women in Islam
Divorce in Islam
Ketubah, the Jewish marriage contract

References

External links 
Articles / Knowledge on Marriage within Islam at muslimwedding.org

Islamic jurisprudence
Prenuptial agreements